A. domesticus may refer to:

 Acheta domesticus, the house cricket, an insect species
 Aedes domesticus, a mosquito species in the genus Aedes

Synonyms
 Agaricus domesticus, a synonym for Coprinellus domesticus, a mushroom species
 Araneus domesticus, a synonym for Malthonica ferruginea, a spider species

See also
 Domesticus (disambiguation)